Chiltepec-Tlacoatzintepec Chinantec is a Chinantecan language of Mexico, spoken in northern Oaxaca in the towns of San José Chiltepec, San Juan Bautista Tlacoatzintepec, San Pedro Alianza, Santiago Quetzalapa, and San Juan Zapotitlán. The two principal varieties, Chinantec and Tlacoatzintepec, have marginal mutual intelligibility. They are close to Sochiapan Chinantec.

Phonology 
The following are sounds of Tlacoatzintepec Chinantec:
Consonants

1. Parenthesised sounds are loans, allophones, or free variants
2. /r/ is an alveolar flap in unstressed syllable; a retroflexed alveopalatal grooved affricate in a stressed syllable
3. /t, ts, θ, l, s, n, ŋ, k, ɡ, h/ can be palatalised before the semivowel /j/
4. /p, ŋ, k, ɡ, h/ can be labialised before the semivowel /w/

Vowels

1. Vowels to the left of the bullet dot are unrounded; to the right rounded

Vowels

References

Chinantec languages